This is a list of notable sausages. Sausage is a food usually made from ground meat with a skin around it. Typically, a sausage is formed in a casing traditionally made from intestine, but sometimes synthetic. Some sausages are cooked during processing and the casing may be removed after. Sausage making is a traditional food preservation technique. Sausages may be preserved.

By type

 Blood sausage
 Boerewors
 Fermented sausage – a type of sausage that is created by salting chopped or ground meat to remove moisture, while allowing beneficial bacteria to break down sugars into flavorful molecules.
 
 
 
 
 
 
 
 
 
 
 
 
 
 Vegetarian sausage – may be made from tofu, seitan, nuts, pulses, mycoprotein, soya protein, vegetables or any combination of similar ingredients that will hold together during cooking
 Volkswagen currywurst – a brand of sausage manufactured by the Volkswagen car maker since 1973
 White pudding
 Winter salami

By country
Notes:

 Many sausages do not have a unique name. E.g. "salchicha", "country sausage", etc.
 Sausages with the same name in different countries may be identical, similar, or significantly different. This also applies to names with different spellings in different regions, e.g. lukanka, loukaniko; bloedworst, blutwurst. The chorizo of many South American countries is different from the Spanish chorizo.

Argentina

 Bondiola
 Chorizo
 Longaniza
 Morcilla
 Salamin

Australia
 Bunnings Sausage/ Democracy Sausage (or snags) see Sausage sizzle
 Chipolata
 Devon (also known as 'Polony' or 'Fritz')
 Kanga Bangas
 Saveloy

Austria

 Blunze
 Extrawurst
 Jausenwurst
 Käsekrainer
 Vienna sausage

Belgium
 Bloedworst
 Cervela

Brazil
 Chouriço doce
 Linguiça
 Salsichão
 Brativurst

Brunei
 Belutak

Bulgaria

 Lukanka
 Sujuk

Canada
 Lunenburg pudding

Chile
 Chorizo
 Longaniza

China

Colombia

 Butifarra Soledeñas
 Longaniza
 Chorizo, chorizo santarrosano
 Morcilla (Rellena)
 Chunchullo

Croatia
 Češnovka
 Kulen
 Švargl
 Čajna

Cuba
 Chorizo
 Moronga

Czechia
 Jelito
 Špekáček
 Talián
 Trampské cigáro
 Ostravská klobása
 Vinná klobása

Denmark

 Blodpølse
 Medisterpølse
 Rød pølse
 Ringriderpølse
 Sønderjysk spegepølse
 Sardel

El Salvador
 
 Butifarra
 Chorizo
 Longaniza

Estonia
 Verivorst

Faroe Islands
 Blóðpylsa

Finland
 Mustamakkara
 Ryynimakkara
 Siskonmakkara

France

Georgia
 Kupati

Germany

Greece
 Loukaniko
 Noumboulo
 Seftalia these are minced meat wrapped in reticulate fat. It is usually sheep's meat or pork. A small amount of salt, pepper and oregano is present. They are sold raw with the intention of slowly grilling or frying in olive oil by the customer. Size about 10 cm long, 3–4 cm wide. There will be 15-30 in one kilo.
 Salami aeras are a salami type sausages primarily from the island of Lefkada, air dried [hence the name, aeras]. The consistency is solid, intended for slicing very thinly. They make a very good starter. Eaten as they are bought, no cooking required. A/B supermarkets and local butchers sell sausages under this name.

Hungary

 Csabai
 Gyulai
 Pick
 Debrecener
 Hungarian sausages
 Liverwurst
 Winter salami

India
 Goan Sausage
Doh snam

Indonesia
 Frikandel
 Saren
 Sosis solo
 Urutan – traditional Balinese smoked or air-dried sausage, made from pork stuffed into pig intestines

Ireland
 Black pudding
 Drisheen
 White pudding

Italy

 Biroldo
Ciauscolo
Cervellata
Ciavàr
Cotechino
Cotechino Modena
Genoa salami
 Kaminwurz or kaminwurze – air-dried and cold-smoked sausage (Rohwurst) made of beef and fatback or pork, produced in the South Tyrol region of northern Italy. Occasionally, kaminwurz is also made of lamb, goat or venison. The name of the sausage comes from the custom of curing the sausages in a smokehouse attached to the chimney up on the roof truss of Tyrolean houses.
Likëngë
Luganega
Mortadella
Mazzafegati
'Nduja
Salami
Soppressata
Zampina

Italian salami

Salumi are Italian cured meat products and predominantly made from pork. Only sausage versions of salami are listed below. See the salami article and Category:Salumi for additional varieties.

Japan
 Arabiki
 Fish sausage (:ja:魚肉ソーセージ)
 Kurobuta
 no casing (cf. :ja:ウイニー)
 Tako

Kazakhstan
 Qazy

Korea

 Sundae

Laos
 Lao sausage
 Som moo
 Sai gork

Lebanon
 Makanek, also referred to as na'anik

Lithuania

 Skilandis

Namibia
 Boerewors
 Droëwors

Norway
 Vossakorv
 Morrpølse
 Grillpølse

Malaysia
 Lekor – fish sausage
 Tong Mo

Mexico
 Chorizo
 Moronga

Morocco
 Merguez

Netherlands

Palestine
 Makanek
 Sujuk
 Masareen

Peru
 Salchicha Huachana

Philippines

 Alaminos longganisa 
 Baguio longganisa
 Cabanatuan longganisa 
 Calumpit longganisa or Longganisang Bawang 
 Chicken longganisa
 Chorizo de Bilbao
 Chorizo de Cebu or Longganisa de Cebu 
 Chorizo de Macao
 Chorizo Negrense or Bacolod Longganisa 
 Fish longganisa
 Guagua longganisa
 Longaniza de Guinobatan or Guinobatan Longganisa
 Lucban longganisa 
 Pampanga longganisa 
 Pinuneg 
 Tuguegarao longganisa or Longganisang Ybanag 
 Vigan longganisa

Poland

 Kielbasa
  Kiełbasa biała – a white sausage sold uncooked
 Kiełbasa jałowcowa (staropolska)
 Kiełbasa myśliwska (staropolska)
 Kiełbasa wędzona – Polish smoked sausage
 Kabanos (Kabanosy staropolskie) – a thin, air-dried sausage flavoured with caraway seed, originally made of pork
 Krakowska (Kiełbasa krakowska sucha staropolska) – a thick, straight sausage hot-smoked with pepper and garlic
 Wiejska – a large U-shaped pork and veal sausage with marjoram and garlic
 Weselna – "wedding" sausage, medium thick, u-shaped smoked sausage; often eaten during parties, but not exclusively
 Kaszanka or kiszka – traditional blood sausage or black pudding
 Myśliwska – smoked, dried pork sausage. 
 Prasky

Portugal

Puerto Rico

 Butifarra
 Chorizo
 Longaniza
 Morcilla
 Mortadella
 Salchichón

Romania

 Babic
 Banat sausage
Pleşcoi sausage
 Nădlac sausage
 Tobă
 Sibiu sausage

Russia
 Doktorskaya kolbasa 
 Lyubitelskaya
 Sardelka – a small cooked sausage that is eaten like a frankfurter; it is, however, thicker than a typical frankfurter.
 Stolichnaya Sausage

Serbia
 Kulen
 Sremska kobasica
 Пеглана кобасица

Slovakia
 Hurka
 Krvavnička
 Liptovská saláma
 Spišské párky

South Africa
 Boerewors
 Droëwors
 Plaaswors
 Braai Wors
 Grabouw Wors
 Elim Wors

Spain

Surinam
 bloedworst ("blood sausage") – typically made with pig blood, onions, garlic and breadcrumbs.
 vleesworst ( "meat sausage") – a type of white pudding

Sweden
 Falukorv
 Fläskkorv
 Isterband
 Potatiskorv
 Prinskorv

Switzerland

 Cervelat
 Schüblig
 St. Galler Bratwurst
 Landjäger
 Salame ticinese
 Salsiz
 Saucisse de choux
 Saucisson Vaudois

Taiwan

 Small sausage in large sausage – segment of Taiwanese pork sausage wrapped in a (slightly bigger and fatter) sticky rice sausage, usually served chargrilled

Thailand

 Naem
 Sai krok Isan
 Sai ua

Tunisia
 Merguez

Turkey
 Sucuk

Ukraine
 Blood sausage Krov`janka (krov – blood)
 Gurka Sausage is an offal Sausage.
 Kishka
 Liverwurst Pashtetivka 
 Odesa Sausage
 Ukrainian Kovbasa Ukrainian Sausage

United Kingdom

 Battered sausage – Found all across the United Kingdom, Ireland, Australia and New Zealand.
 Beef sausage
 Black pudding
 Chipolata
 Glamorgan sausage
 Hog's pudding
 Pork sausage
 Pork and leek (sometimes called Welsh sausage)
 Red Pudding (mainly in Scotland)
 Sausage roll
 Saveloy
 Snorkers
 Stonner kebab
 Tomato sausage (pork and tomato)
 White pudding

English

 Braughing sausage
 Cumberland sausage
 Gloucester sausage – made from Gloucester Old Spot pork, which has a high fat content.
 Lincolnshire sausage
 Manchester sausage – prepared using pork, white pepper, mace, nutmeg, ginger, sage and cloves
 Marylebone sausage – a traditional London butchers sausage made with mace, ginger and sage
 Newmarket sausage
 Oxford sausage – pork, veal and lemon
 Yorkshire sausage – white pepper, mace, nutmeg and cayenne
 Pork and apple

Scottish
 Haggis
 Lorne sausage
 Stornoway black pudding

Welsh
 Glamorgan sausage
 Dragon sausage – pork, leek and chili pepper sausage.

United States

 Andouille
 Bockwurst in North America, resemble Bavarian Weisswurst
 Bologna sausage
 Boudin
 Breakfast sausage
 Chaudin
 Goetta
 Half-smoke – "local sausage delicacy" found in Washington, D.C. and the surrounding region
 Hog maw
 Hot dog
 Hot link
 Italian sausage
 Knoblewurst – a Jewish specialty; "a plump, beef sausage that’s seasoned with garlic."
 Lebanon bologna
 Pepperoni
 Thuringer in North America, refer to Thuringer cervelat, a summer sausage

Venezuela
 Chorizo

Vietnam

 
 : :vi:Chả cốm; Cốm;

Zimbabwe
 Boerewors

See also

 Bucyrus Bratwurst Festival
 Casing
 Global cuisine
 List of dried foods
 List of pork dishes
 List of sausage dishes
 List of smoked foods
 Salumeria
 Smoked meat

References

External links
 
 
 

 
 
Sausage list
Sausage list
Sausage list
Salumi